Sook Nyul Choi (born 1937) is a Korean American children's storybook author.

Writing
Choi's native language is Korean. Choi writes about her own experiences as a young refugee from North Korea during the Korean War through her heroines in her books. She said, "I now have two countries, my native country of Korea, and my adopted country, the United States. Through my writing, I want to bring to life the history and culture of Korea to share with all my American friends."

In her first young adult book, The Year of Impossible Goodbyes (1991), Choi writes about 10-year-old Sookan's life and her family during the brutal Japanese occupation of the Korean Peninsula. When World War II ends, the Russian Army occupies the area north of the 38th Parallel thus creating Communist North Korea. This is the story of Sookan's life under the Japanese and Russian Occupation, and her harrowing escape from North Korea to South Korea in search of freedom.

The book won numerous awards including Best Books for Young Adults, ALA Notable Book and Judy Lopez Book Award by the National Women's Book Association. It has been translated into several languages including Korean, French, Italian, and Japanese. It is also available in Braille and in audio book.

Her books can be used not only to promote reading and writing, but also to tie literature into the social studies curriculum in middle schools, high schools, and also political science at the college level. Choi's books explore themes of communism, freedom, international politics, and interaction among nations. They can be used to teach about socio-geopolitical events and historical realities of Asian nations, including how big powers affect the fate of small nations.

Choi's works are also featured in many literary books and reference books for educators.
 
 Oxford Companion to Women's Writing, edited by Cathy N. Davidson, Linda Wagner-Martin
  Contemporary Authors by Gale Group, Volume 197
  Author and Artists for Young Adult, by Gale Group, Volume 38
  Multicultural Voices in Contemporary Literature:  a Resource for Teachers, by Frances Ann Day
  Themes in Reading:  a Multicultural Collection, by Jamestown Publishers, Volume 1
  Eight Book of Junior Authors and Illustrators, edited by Connie G Rockman
  Something About the Authors, Volume 73, 126, 131, by Gale Group
  Children's Literature Reviews, by Gale Group, edited by Deborah J Morad
  Literature Works, Collection 3, Book 1, by Silver Burdett Ginn
 Houghton Mifflin Reading by Horizons
 Celebrate: Invitation to Literature, by Houghton Mifflin
 Lecture Reading, My Time to Shine, Siego Yo, Siego Yo!, by Scott Foresman
 Yellow Light, edited by Amy Ling
 Themes in Reading: a Multicultural Connection, Volume 1, by Jamestown Publishing, a resource for teachers
 Asia Pacific Reader, by Madeline Mattarozzi Laming, Oxford University Press
 Asian American Authors, by Kathi Ishizuka
 Encuentros Maravillosos, Serie de Español para La Escuela Elemental, Pearson Educación

Personal life
Choi was born in Pyongyang, now part of North Korea. During the Korean War, she fled to South Korea. She emigrated to the United States to pursue higher education, earning her B.A. from Manhattanville College in 1962 and becoming a school teacher in New York. She later moved to Cambridge, Massachusetts, where she began working as a writer, lecturer, and creative writing teacher. She is the widow of Nung Ho Choi, with whom she had two daughters. The older daughter, Kathleen Choi, was a child actress on Sesame Street and Romper Room, and in 1993 went on to marry John J. H. Kim of Fort Lee, New Jersey, the great-grandson of Korean prime minister Kim Hong-jip. The younger daughter Audrey Choi was formerly chief-of-staff of the Council of Economic Advisers, and married Robert C. Orr, an aide to Richard Holbrooke, in 2000. Choi was also featured in Audrey's 2016 TED Talk titled, How to Make a Profit While Making a Difference.

Books
 Year of the Impossible Goodbyes.  New York:  Dell, 1991, 
 Echoes of the White Giraffe, Houghton Mifflin, 1993
 Halmoni and the Picnic, Houghton Mifflin Books for Children, 1993
 Gathering of Pearls, Houghton Mifflin, 1994
 The Best Older Sister, Delacorte Books for Young Readers, 1997
 Yunmi and Halmoni's Trip, Houghton Mifflin, 1997,

Awards

References

External links
 Papertigers.org - Interview with author Sook Nyul Choi
 Harvard Family Research Project - Interview with Sook Nyul Choi
 Author website Learning about Sook Nyul Choi
 How to Make a Profit While Making a Difference Ted talk by Audrey Choi

1937 births
Living people
American writers of Korean descent
Manhattanville College alumni
People from Pyongyang
South Korean emigrants to the United States
American children's writers
American novelists of Asian descent
20th-century American novelists
20th-century American women writers
American women children's writers
American women novelists
21st-century American women